Jesús Guillermo Luzardo (born September 30, 1997) is a Peruvian professional baseball pitcher for the Miami Marlins of Major League Baseball (MLB). He previously played for the Oakland Athletics. He also identifies as Venezuelan.

Career

Early life
Luzardo was born to Venezuelan parents in Lima, Peru, although Luzardo identifies as an American due to his upbringing since he grew up all his life in the United States, and also has a great love for Venezuela. He moved to South Florida at the age of one and later attended Marjory Stoneman Douglas High School in Parkland, Florida. He graduated in 2016. He was late for a practice at the school on the day of the Stoneman Douglas High School shooting in 2018 and was warned to stay away.

Washington Nationals
He was drafted in the third round of the 2016 Major League Baseball draft by the Washington Nationals, making him the first Peru-born player drafted by an MLB team since at least 1990.  He subsequently became the first Peruvian-born player to appear in the major leagues.

Luzardo tore his ulnar collateral ligament in his pitching arm and underwent Tommy John surgery, performed by Dr. James Andrews, in March 2016. The Nationals, who drafted him, were known for taking chances on players who had already undergone or needed to have Tommy John surgery, and they committed to completing his rehabilitation. Luzardo forwent a commitment to the University of Miami to sign with the organization. Luzardo made his professional debut on June 28, 2017, with the GCL Nationals against the GCL Marlins, reportedly hitting  with his fastball.

Oakland Athletics
The Nationals traded Luzardo, Sheldon Neuse, and Blake Treinen to the Oakland Athletics on July 16, 2017, for Sean Doolittle and Ryan Madson. After joining Oakland, he played for the Arizona League Athletics and the Vermont Lake Monsters. In 12 total games between the Nationals, Athletics, and Lake Monsters, he posted a 2–1 record with a 1.66 ERA with 48 strikeouts in   innings.

Luzardo was ranked among the top prospects in the minor leagues prior to 2018. He started the season with the Stockton Ports and was promoted to the Double-A Midland RockHounds early on in the season. He made his Triple-A debut with the Nashville Sounds on August 6. Across three levels in 2018, Luzardo combined for a 10–5 record with a 2.88 ERA and 129 strikeouts. His performance was recognized by being named to the Texas League's mid and post-season All-Star teams and being selected to participate in the All-Star Futures Game.

Entering 2019, Luzardo was in competition for a spot on the A's Opening Day roster. In  innings over 4 spring starts, he held batters to 2 hits and 4 walks while striking out 15. A strained left rotator cuff late in spring training resulted in him being shut down and missing the start of the season. On June 11, 2019, Luzardo returned to the mound with Class A-Advanced Stockton, and allowed one run over seven innings spanning two outings with 11 strikeouts before being promoted to Triple A-Las Vegas. Unfortunately, he exited his third outing in Las Vegas with a lat strain, putting his plans to join the A's rotation on hold.

The Athletics selected Luzardo's contract and promoted him to the major leagues on September 9, 2019. He made his major league debut on September 11 versus the Houston Astros, pitching three innings in relief. He appeared in 6 games in September for Oakland.

On July 7, 2020, it was announced that Luzardo had tested positive for COVID-19. The diagnosis forced the A's to put Luzardo in the bullpen to begin the season, but he only needed two relief appearances before making his first big league start on August 4 against the Texas Rangers. Luzardo got his first big league win in his next start on August 9 against the Houston Astros. He finished the season with a record of 3-2 and an ERA of 4.12 in 12 games (9 starts).

Luzardo began the 2021 season in the A's rotation, but struggled to a 5.79 ERA over six starts before requiring time on the injured list, after accidentally slamming his throwing hand on a table while playing a video game, resulting in a fractured pinky. By the time he returned to the team on May 30, James Kaprielian had claimed his place in the rotation, and Luzardo was used out of the bullpen. He began his tenure with four scoreless innings, but allowed six home runs in his next five outings before being optioned to Triple-A Las Vegas on June 21.

Miami Marlins
On July 28, 2021, the Athletics traded Luzardo to the Miami Marlins in exchange for Starling Marte and cash considerations. He made 12 starts for the Marlins down the stretch, working to a 4-5 record and 6.44 ERA with 58 strikeouts in 57.1 innings pitched.

On May 15, 2022, Luzardo was placed on the injured list with a left forearm strain, and was transferred to the 60-day IL on June 15.

Luzardo's 2023 salary was set by the arbitration process at $2.45 million.

References

External links

1997 births
Living people
Arizona League Athletics players
Venezuelan expatriate baseball players in the United States
Gulf Coast Nationals players
Las Vegas Aviators players
Major League Baseball pitchers
Miami Marlins players
Midland RockHounds players
Nashville Sounds players
Oakland Athletics players
Peruvian expatriate sportspeople in the United States
Peruvian people of Venezuelan descent
Sportspeople from Lima
Stockton Ports players
Vermont Lake Monsters players
2023 World Baseball Classic players